Denmark–Venezuela relations refers to the current and historical relations between Denmark and Venezuela. Denmark is accredited to Venezuela from its embassy in Brasilia, Brazil. Venezuela is accredited to Denmark from its embassy in Oslo, Norway. In 1878, the relations between Denmark and Venezuela were described as "friendly".

History

On 26 March 1838, Denmark and Venezuela agreed to sign a Treaty of Amity, Commerce and Navigation. On 18 July 1858, Denmark and Venezuela signed a special treaty about customs. In 1863, a Friendship, Commerce and Navigation treaty was signed in Caracas between Denmark and Venezuela, the treaty was described as the most liberal ones of Venezuela.

In 1902, there were incorrect statements in the press, that Denmark has claimed Venezuela since 1837. During the Venezuela Crisis of 1902–1903, American ambassador to Venezuela Herbert W. Bowen transferred the defence of Venezuela to Venezuela's allies including Denmark.

During the period from 1938 to 1948, dozens of Danish families emigrated to Venezuela. On 5 June 1938, 187 Danes sailed for Venezuela.

Commercial relations
In 1831 to 1832, the total trade between Denmark and Venezuela amounted 7,876,000 francs. In 1841 to 1842, the trade reached a maximum of 1,700,000 million francs. The trade was conducted almost through the Danish colony of Saint Thomas.

In 2007, Danish export to Venezuela amounted 347 million DKK, while imports from Venezuela amounted 163 million DKK. From January to September 2008, Danish export to Venezuela amounted 304 million DKK while import from Venezuela amounted 196 million DKK.

State visits
Venezuelan President Hugo Chavez visited Denmark in December 2009, for the 2009 United Nations Climate Change Conference.

See also 
 Foreign relations of Denmark 
 Foreign relations of Venezuela
 Danish West India Company

References

 
 
Venezuela
Bilateral relations of Venezuela